Vaia Anne Zaganas (born May 22, 1975) is a former Canadian and American female boxer from Burnaby, British Columbia.

Career
After discovering the sport at an early age, Zaganas went on to win the Canadian National Championships title in 1998. As part of Canada's National team, she compiled an impressive record of 36–4, winning fights in Canada, the United States and Europe. Other highlights of her amateur career include winning a second national title, twice winning gold at the U.S.A. vs Canada dual meet, twice winning gold at the U.S. national Blue and Gold event and being named "Most Outstanding Boxer" of the tournament. In 2000, she won Canada's "Rookie of The Year" award for best performance in international competition, male or female.

Before turning professional, Zaganas was ranked number one in the world by AIBA in her weight division. She moved to Las Vegas, Nevada later that year to pursue a professional boxing career. Her success in the ring continued, as she won the IFBA Straw-weight World Championship in 2002 and the NABF light-flyweight World Championship in 2004. Considered one of the best pound-for-pound boxers in the world, Zaganas now has an overall professional record of 16–3 with 6 KO’s.

Later career 
After her boxing career, Zaganas became a stunt performer and actress.

Professional record
Over the course of her professional boxing career, Zaganas had 16 wins, 3 losses and 0 draws.

See also
 World Amateur Boxing Championships

References

External links
 
 International Female Boxers Association
 Vaia Zaganas at Women Boxing Archive Network
 Interview: 12 Rounds with Vaia Zaganas
 
 Instagram | Vaia Zaganas
Facebook | Vaia Zaganas

1975 births
Sportspeople from Burnaby
Canadian women boxers
Living people
Mini-flyweight boxers